The discography of Pharoahe Monch, an American hip hop artist, consists of four studio albums, eleven singles and two mixtapes.

Albums

Studio albums

Collaborations

Mixtapes

Singles

As lead artist

Guest appearances

References

Monch, Pharoahe
Monch, Pharoahe